Kellas is a village in Angus, Scotland. It lies approximately two miles north of Dundee, on the B978 road.

References

Villages in Angus, Scotland